Beauprea congesta is a species of plant in the family Proteaceae. It is endemic to New Caledonia.

References

External links

Endemic flora of New Caledonia
congesta
Endangered plants
Taxonomy articles created by Polbot